FS Napajedla is a Czech football club located in Napajedla in the Zlín Region. It currently plays in the Regional Championship (Zlín), which is in the fifth level of Czech football. The club has taken part in the Czech Cup numerous times, reaching the first round in 1998–99, 2001–02 and 2009–10.

References

External links
  

Football clubs in the Czech Republic
Association football clubs established in 1912
Zlín Region
1912 establishments in Austria-Hungary